Son La Women's Football Club is a Vietnam women's football club, based in Sơn La, Vietnam. The team plays in the Vietnam women's football championship.

The team is currently playing at Sơn La Stadium.

History 
The club was founded in 2011 and joined the Vietnam women's football championship in 2016.

Honours

Domestic competitions

League 
 Vietnam women's football championship

Current squad 
As of 11 May 2017

References

External links 
http://vff.org.vn/vo-dich-quoc-gia-nu-518

Women's football in Vietnam